The 1958 PGA Tour season was played from January 3 to December 14. The season consisted of 45 official money events. Ken Venturi won the most tournaments with four. Arnold Palmer was the leading money winner with earnings of $42,608. Dow Finsterwald was voted the PGA Player of the Year after winning two tournaments including the 1958 PGA Championship. Bob Rosburg won the Vardon Trophy for the lowest scoring average.

Schedule
The following table lists official events during the 1958 season.

Unofficial events
The following events were sanctioned by the PGA Tour, but did not carry official money, nor were wins official.

Awards

Notes

References

External links
PGA Tour official site

PGA Tour seasons
PGA Tour